Strymon crambusa is a butterfly of the family Lycaenidae. It was described by William Chapman Hewitson in 1874. It is found in Brazil and Bolivia.

References

 Strymon crambusa at Neotropical Butterflies

cram
Lycaenidae of South America
Lepidoptera of Brazil
Invertebrates of Bolivia
Butterflies described in 1874
Taxa named by William Chapman Hewitson